The fifth Gran Premio de Madrid, was the seventh round of the 1983 European Championship for F2 Drivers. This was held at Circuito Permanente del Jarama, north of the Spanish capital, Madrid, on 12 June. This was first time the race was held since 1971.

Report

Entry
A total of 26 F2 cars were entered for the event, however of which 23 took part in qualifying.

Qualifying
Jonathan Palmer took pole position for Ralt Racing Ltd, in their Ralt-Honda RH6/83H, averaging a speed of 99.031 mph.

Race
The race was held over 65 laps of a Jarama circuit. Mike Thackwell took the winner spoils for works Ralt team, driving their Ralt-Honda RH6/83H. Thackwell won in a time of 1hr 28:50.80mins., averaging a speed of 92.737 mph. Around 2.36 seconds behind was the second place car, driven by Stefan Bellof, for the Maurer Motorsport team in their own BMW-engined MM83.  The podium was completed by the second works Ralt, of Jonathan Palmer.

Classification

Race Result

 Fastest lap: Mike Thackwell, 1:10.02ecs. (108.65 mph)

References

Jarama
Jarama
Formula Two